Valmir Louruz (Porto Alegre, March 13, 1944 – April 29, 2015) was a Brazilian football manager.

Managerial statistics

Honors

Player 
 Internacional
 Campeonato Gaúcho: 1969, 1970, 1971

Manager 
 CSA
 Campeonato Alagoano: 1981

 Vitória
 Campeonato Baiano: 1989

 Júbilo Iwata
 J. League Cup: 1998

 Juventude
 Copa do Brasil: 1999

References

External links

1944 births
2015 deaths
Sportspeople from Porto Alegre
Brazilian footballers
Association football defenders
Esporte Clube Pelotas players
Sociedade Esportiva Palmeiras players
Sport Club Internacional players
Centro Sportivo Alagoano players
Campeonato Brasileiro Série A players
Brazilian football managers
Esporte Clube Juventude managers
Esporte Clube Pelotas managers
Centro Sportivo Alagoano managers
Grêmio Esportivo Brasil managers
Londrina Esporte Clube managers
Tuna Luso Brasileira managers
Esporte Clube Vitória managers
Clube Náutico Capibaribe managers
Santa Cruz Futebol Clube managers
Paysandu Sport Club managers
Júbilo Iwata managers
Sport Club Internacional managers
Figueirense FC managers
Vila Nova Futebol Clube managers
São José Esporte Clube managers
Al-Ahli Saudi FC managers
Duque de Caxias Futebol Clube managers
Clube de Regatas Brasil managers
Campeonato Brasileiro Série A managers
Campeonato Brasileiro Série B managers
J1 League managers
Saudi Professional League managers
Brazilian expatriate football managers
Brazilian expatriate sportspeople in Japan
Brazilian expatriate sportspeople in Saudi Arabia
Brazilian expatriate sportspeople in Kuwait
Expatriate football managers in Japan
Expatriate football managers in Kuwait
Expatriate football managers in Saudi Arabia